(born February 21, 1984) is a Japanese model and actress. She was born in Shōwa-ku, Nagoya, Aichi Prefecture. She played the lead role in the 2008 TBS drama Daisuki!!

Filmography

Dramas
 Kabachitare (2001)
 Long Love Letter  (2002)
 Division 1 (2004)
 Nurseman ga Yuku  (2004)
 Umizaru (2005) 
 Yaoh (2006)
 CA to Oyobi (2006)
 Message (2006)
 Walk My Way / Boku no Aruku Michi (2006) 
 Tsubasa no Oreta Tenshitachi / Angels with Broken Wings (2007)
 Bambino! (2007)
 Ushi ni Negai wo: Love & Farm (2007)
 Daisuki!! (2008)
 Sensei wa Erai! (2008)
 Ryokiteki na Kanojo (2008) 
 Kiri no Hi (2008)
 Myu no Anyo Papa ni Ageru (2008)
 Real Clothes  (2008) as Kinue Amano 
 Galileo: Episode Zero (2008) as Namie Shindo
 Love Shuffle (2009) as Airu Aizawa
 Kochira Katsushika-ku Kameari Koen-mae Hashutsujo (2009) as Catherine Reiko Akimoto 
 Hataraku Gon! (2009) as Izumi Ami
 Real Clothes (2009) as Kinue Amano
 Freeter, Ie o Kau. (2010) as Manami Chiba
 Misaki Number One!! (2011) as Misaki Tenoji
 Freeter, Ie o Kau. SP (2011) as Manami Chiba 
 The Reason I Can't Find My Love (Watashi ga Renai Dekinai Riyuu) (2011) as Emi Fujii 
 Dirty Mama! (2012) as Aoi Nagashima 
 Honto ni Atta Kowai Hanashi 2012 Aru Natsu no Dekigoto (2012)
 PRICELESS ~Aru Wake Nedaro,n namon!~ (2012) as Aya Nikaido 
 Summer Nude (2013) as Natsuki Chiyohara
 kekkonshiki no zenjitsu ni as hitomi serizawa
 kirawareru yuuki (2017) as ando ranko
 AI~watashi to kanojo to jinkou chinou as tanaka shizuku
 takane no hana (2018) as chiaki shinjo (ep.7)
 Koi wa tsuzuku yo doko made mo (2020) as Ryuko Tendo
 Why Didn’t I Tell You a Million Times? (2023)

Film
Sky of Love (2007)
Doraemon: The Record of Nobita's Spaceblazer (2009)
Omoide Shashin (2021)
And So I'm at a Loss (2023)

Other works

Magazines
 『Ray』 (2000-2014)
 『GINGER』 (2009-)

Books
『KARINA』 (2005.1.25)
『I can.』 (2008.10.31)
『One.』 (2011.10.27)

References

External links

 karina-karina.com

Japanese television actresses
People from Nagoya
1984 births
Living people
Japanese female models